Sheypoor ("bugle") is a classified ads platform website and mobile application, headquartered in Tehran, Iran.

Thousands of advertisements are added to the app every day.

See also 
Divar (website)

References

External links 
 Official website

Persian-language websites
E-commerce websites
Mobile software
Android (operating system) software
IOS software
Privately held companies of Iran
Online companies
Online marketplaces of Iran